The 2013–14 season is a season in Belgian Pro League played by R.S.C. Anderlecht, a Belgian football club based in Anderlecht, Brussels. The season covers the period from 1 July 2013 to 30 June 2014.

Match results
League positions are sourced from Statto, while the remaining contents of each table are sourced from the references in the "Ref" column.

Belgian Pro League

Regular season

Championship playoff

Belgian Super Cup

Belgian Cup

UEFA Champions League

Group stage

Appearances and goals

Numbers in parentheses denote appearances as substitute.
Players with names struck through and marked  left the club during the playing season.
Players with names in italics and marked * were on loan from another club with Anderlecht.
Key to positions: GK – Goalkeeper; DF – Defender; MF – Midfielder; FW – Forward

References

R.S.C. Anderlecht seasons
Anderlecht
Anderlecht
Belgian football championship-winning seasons